St. Augustine Catholic Church and Cemetery, or the Isle Brevelle Church, is a historic Catholic parish property founded in 1829 near Melrose, Natchitoches Parish, Louisiana. It is the cultural center of the Cane River area's historic Black Creole community.

Established as a mission church by mixed-race freedman Nicolas Augustin Metoyer, St. Augustine is celebrated as the first church in Louisiana to be built by and for free people of color. It is also among the oldest churches founded and built by and for people of African descent in the United States.

The church and cemetery are within the Cane River National Heritage Area, and are listed on the National Register of Historic Places. Because of its significance in Catholic and Creole history, St. Augustine also is a marked destination on the Louisiana African American Heritage Trail.

History

19th century
Tradition holds that the church was established by Nicolas Augustin Metoyer in 1803 and that services have been held continuously since then. Historical records challenge the local lore. Parish records document the founding of the Chapel of St. Augustine "as a mission of the church of St. François of Natchitoches" in July 1829, shortly after the church was constructed. The mission was recognized in 1856 as a parish in its own right, and authorized a resident priest.

When Father Jean Baptiste Blanc consecrated the chapel for religious use (19 July 1829), he reported that it had been "erected on Isle Brevelle on the plantation of Sieur Augustin Metoyer through the care and generosity of the above-named Augustin Metoyer, aided by Louis Metoyer, his brother. ... The said chapel ... having been dedicated to St. Augustine, shall be considered as under the protection of this great doctor." Tradition also describes the role of Augustin's brother Louis (founder of the nearby Melrose Plantation, a National Historic Landmark ), as the chapel's designer and builder.

The Church of St. Augustine is distinctive among Southern churches of all denominations for its racial role reversals. Surviving pew records show that the front seats were occupied by the Créole de couleur Metoyer family who built the chapel. Seated behind them were the families of prominent white planters within the community. Post-Civil War, St. Augustine chalked up another apparent first in U.S. racial history: its own congregation by this time was almost exclusively people of color; but, it served as the mother church for the predominantly white congregation of Mission Ste. Anne on Old River.

The original structure has not survived. Union forces during the Red River Campaign of May 1864 were said to have torched the first church.

20th century
A second church burned in the early 1900s. It was replaced by the present-day church building, which was completed in 1917. Tradition holds that early furnishings included paintings of patron saints Augustine and Louis, in honor of the Metoyer brothers, as well as an altar brought from Europe by other family members. The original bell that hung in the belfry above the vestibule is said to be the one still in use. An image of the original church survives as a backdrop in the contemporary oil portrait of its founder that hangs in the church today.

An oil painting titled Papa Augustin Metoyer (c. 1836) has hung in the church since the 1970s, featuring a portrait of Nicolas Augustin Metoyer posing in a Prince Albert coat and swath of green fabric. This painting had been part of the Melrose Planation and went up for auction in the 1970s, the pastor of the church brought the oldest descendants of Nicolas Augustin Metoyer to the auction and they pleaded to be allowed to purchase the painting for the Isle Brevelle community and for display in the church.

For many years an annual festival for the Isle Brevelle community has been held at St. Augustine Church.

Créole community
The Metoyer brothers were two of ten children of the French merchant Claude Thomas Pierre Metoyer and the former slave Marie Thérèse Coincoin, sometimes (albeit erroneously) called Marie Thérèse Metoyer. He had initially leased her services as a domestic and concubine. When the parish priest filed charges against the black Coincoin for bearing mixed-race children while living in the residence of a white man, and threatened to sell her away to New Orleans, Metoyer bought her from her owner and privately manumitted her. Across the next thirty-seven years, he manumitted each of their children.

Coincoin, as a médecine, planter, and businesswoman, worked to buy the freedom of her five older black children from an earlier union with another slave. She secured that freedom for three of them. Together, her offspring and their families created a large Créole of color community in Natchitoches Parish that spread the length of Cane River Lake.

Its core would be, and still is, St. Augustine Parish on Isle Brevelle.

Representation in other media
 Elizabeth Shown Mills's historical novel, Isle of Canes, draws upon her research in both family tradition and primary sources. She explores the founding of St. Augustine and the character of the religious leadership of the Isle Brevelle community in Creole Louisiana.
 The Church is depicted in the 1982 historical romantic drama Cane River, which was lost for decades before being rediscovered a distributed digitally and in theaters beginning in 2020.

See also
 National Register of Historic Places listings in Natchitoches Parish, Louisiana

References

External links

  "Creoles in the Cane River Region", Cane River National Heritage Area: A National Register of Historic Places Travel Itinerary, National Park Service
 
 "Louisiana's African American Heritage Trail", Louisiana Travel
 "St. Augustine Church", (Natchez) Isle Brevelle, Louisiana, Diocese of Alexandria
 The Spirit of a Culture: Cane River Creoles (2005), Louisiana Public Broadcasting
 Gary B. Mills, The Forgotten People: Cane River's Creoles of Color (1977)

Cane River National Heritage Area
Cemeteries in Louisiana
African-American cemeteries
Churches in Natchitoches Parish, Louisiana
Louisiana African American Heritage Trail
Roman Catholic churches completed in 1917
Churches on the National Register of Historic Places in Louisiana
National Register of Historic Places in Natchitoches Parish, Louisiana
Tourist attractions in Natchitoches Parish, Louisiana
20th-century Roman Catholic church buildings in the United States
African-American Roman Catholic churches